Chris Jamieson (born August 28, 1975) is a Canadian former professional ice hockey player.

Life and career
Jamieson was born in Calgary, Alberta, and attended the Southern Alberta Institute of Technology (SAIT) where he played hockey within the Canadian Collegiate Athletic Association (CCAA). He was recognised for his outstanding play when he was named the 1997-98 SAIT Athlete of the Year, and was selected to the CCAA All-Canadian Team.

Jamieson began his professional career playing the 1998-99 season with the Peterborough Pirates of the British National League (BNL), and the following season he suited up with the Paisley Pirates of the BNL. During the 2000–01 season Jamieson skated with both the Peterborough Pirates and the Tulsa Oilers of the Central Hockey League before retiring from professional hockey.

Awards and honours

References

External links

1975 births
Living people
Canadian ice hockey left wingers
Fayetteville Force players
Paisley Pirates players
Peterborough Pirates players
Ice hockey people from Calgary
Tulsa Oilers (1992–present) players
Canadian expatriate ice hockey players in England
Canadian expatriate ice hockey players in Scotland
Canadian expatriate ice hockey players in the United States